Green Sea Airport  is a privately owned, public-use airport in Horry County, South Carolina, United States. It is located four nautical miles (7 km) northwest of the central business district of Green Sea, South Carolina.

Facilities and aircraft 
It has one runway designated 9/27 with a turf surface measuring 3,600 by 100 feet (1,097 x 30 m). For the 12-month period ending 17 September 2019, the airport had 250 general aviation aircraft operations, an average of 20 per month.

References

External links 
 Green Sea (S79) airport data from South Carolina Division of Aeronautics
 IFR aircraft movements from South Carolina Division of Aeronautics
 Map of the airport from OpenStreetMap
 

Airports in South Carolina
Transportation in Horry County, South Carolina
Buildings and structures in Horry County, South Carolina